Thomas Danforth  (baptized November 20, 1623 – November 5, 1699) was a politician, magistrate, and landowner in the Massachusetts Bay Colony.  A conservative Puritan, he served for many years as one of the colony's councilors and magistrates, generally leading opposition to attempts by the English kings to assert control over the colony.  He accumulated land in the central part of the colony that eventually became a portion of Framingham, Massachusetts.  His government roles included administration of territory in present-day Maine that was purchased by the colony.

Danforth was a magistrate and leading figure in the colony at the time of the Salem witch trials, but did not sit on the Court of Oyer and Terminer.  Despite this, he is inaccurately depicted in Arthur Miller's 1953 play The Crucible and its movie adaptations as doing so. He is presented as a harsh and domineering governor, apparently conflated with William Stoughton, who does not appear in Miller's play (although he and Samuel Sewall are mentioned briefly by Danforth in Act 3, Scene 1). In reality, Danforth is recorded as being critical of the conduct of the trials, and played a role in bringing them to an end.

Early life
Thomas Danforth was born in Framlingham, Suffolk, England, and baptized on November 20, 1623.  He was the eldest son of Nicholas Danforth (1589–1638) and Elizabeth Symmes (1596–1629). Danforth immigrated with his father, brothers Samuel and Jonathan, and sisters Anna, Elizabeth, and Lydia to New England in 1634, probably aboard the Griffin. The family, along with the 200 or so other passengers aboard, left England to escape persecution for their Puritan beliefs. William Laud had become archbishop of the Church of England in 1633 and begun a crackdown on Nonconformist religious practices (such as those practiced by the more Calvinist Puritans) that prompted a wave of migration to the New World.

Public service

Soon after his arrival in the Massachusetts Bay Colony Nicholas Danforth acquired property in Cambridge, becoming one of the town's leading citizens and a member of the colony's general court (as its assembly was known). He died in 1638, leaving his lands and the care of his younger children to Thomas.  In 1643 Danforth was admitted a freeman of the colony, which conferred on him the right to vote and to participate in the colony's political affairs.

He was appointed Treasurer of Harvard College in its charter of 1650, and served as a steward of the college from 1669 to 1682. From 1659 he sat on the colony's council of assistants, and was elected deputy governor in 1679.  In 1665 Danforth was member of a commission that oversaw the extension of Massachusetts colonial authority over the territories of what is now southern Maine, which colonial surveyors had determined to fall within its borders.

Danforth's politics and religion were relatively conservative, with one historian describing him as "the Pym of Massachusetts politics".  In 1661 the colony was rebuked by King Charles II for its mistreatment of Quakers; the colonial government had banned Quakers from its territory under threat of death, and four of them had recently been hanged after repeatedly violating the ban.  The king in his letter demanded that the colony allow Quakers and others freedom of religious expression.  Danforth was one member of a committee that was established to formulate a response.  The document the committee drafted was a conservative declaration that the colonial government was essentially sovereign except where its laws conflicted with English law.  (By the time the king's letter arrived the colonial government had already lessened the harsh punishments for violating bans.)  Two committee members, magistrate Simon Bradstreet and minister John Norton, were sent to England to argue the colony's case.

When King Philip's War broke out in 1675 (pitting many Native American tribes of southern New England against English colonists), Danforth was involved in some of the events of the war.  Many colonists distrusted the Praying Indians (Christianized Indians living peacefully in communities on the outskirts of English towns), some of whom were attacked by mobs of English settlers seeking revenge for attacks on their communities.  Danforth, along with Daniel Gookin and the Indian missionary Reverend John Eliot, was a vocal supporter of the Praying Indians, and worked to prevent some of these excesses, at some personal risk.  In one notable instance Danforth was aboard a small boat with other colonial officials in Boston Harbor en route to Long Island to inspect facilities for Praying Indians who had been relocated there "for their own safety" when a nearby ship apparently intentionally rammed the smaller vessel.  No one was injured in the incident, but all of the older officials were dunked in the cold waters of the harbor.

In 1680 Danforth was chosen president in the District of Maine by the Massachusetts assembly. The colony had previously governed this territory (roughly the land between the Piscataqua and Kennebec Rivers in what is now southwestern Maine), but its right to do so had been stripped by King Charles after protests by the heirs of Sir Ferdinando Gorges, who had long-standing claims to the area.  Agents for Massachusetts then purchased the territory from the Gorges heirs, and Danforth was appointed to administer it.  The territory had been devastated and many properties abandoned during King Philip's War, and Danforth acted in effect as a Lord Proprietor, making land grants and reestablishing towns such as Falmouth and North Yarmouth.  Danforth was rewarded by the colony with a grant of an island in Casco Bay for this work, which he oversaw until 1686.

Throughout the 1670s the Massachusetts leadership steadfastly refused to make changes to its administration that were demanded by King Charles.  At the instigation of agent Edward Randolph, Charles made increasingly specific demands concerning freedom of religion and adherence to colonial trade regulations known as the Navigation Acts, and prepared to issue a quo warranto writ to demand the return of the colonial charter. Danforth was one of the leading opponents to making any accommodation to the king's demands.  The issue reached a peak in the 1684 election, in which Danforth stood for election as governor representing the hardline party.  He was narrowly defeated by the more conciliatory Simon Bradstreet, but retained the post of deputy governor.  The colony's attempts at moderation were in vain—the charter was formally annulled on June 18, 1684.

In 1686 King James II established the Dominion of New England as a new colonial entity to govern all of New England.  He appointed Massachusetts native Joseph Dudley as its first governor; he was replaced later that year by Sir Edmund Andros. Both Dudley and Andros excluded Danforth from their councils, given his opposition to crown authority. The dominion reign, which did not include an elected assembly, was extremely unpopular in Massachusetts for a variety of reasons. When the Glorious Revolution deposed James, Massachusetts Puritan leaders orchestrated an uprising and arrested Andros, Dudley, and other dominion officials. In the period between the dominion's collapse and the establishment of the Province of Massachusetts Bay in 1692, the old colonial government was temporarily reestablished, and Danforth resumed his offices.

Salem trials

In 1692, Danforth was acting governor during the early months of the witch hysteria in Salem and his name appears once in the Salem court records as part of a council which observed the proceedings on April 11. but his involvement ended in May upon the arrival of Sir William Phips, the first royal governor under the new charter of the Province of Massachusetts Bay. Danforth was not assigned to the special Court of Oyer and Terminer that Phips established shortly thereafter, and he was opposed to the manner in which magistrate William Stoughton conducted the witch trials, which unconditionally accepted spectral evidence in its proceedings and vigorously presumed the guilt of the accused. In a letter by Thomas Brattle on October 8, 1692, Danforth is described as among a select group of "several about the Bay, men for understanding, judgement and piety... that do utterly condemn the said proceedings, and do freely deliver their judgment..."

After the Court of Oyer and Terminer stopped sitting, a new Superior Court was created, and, in December 1692, Stoughton was elected by the governor's council to head the court, defeating Danforth by three votes. In early 1693, Danforth sat on Superior Court sessions conducted by Stoughton that continued to hear witchcraft cases, but without accepting spectral evidence. By this time the hysteria was dying down, and the court (sometimes with Danforth leading after Stoughton temporarily removed himself in protest at the ban on spectral evidence and other reforms imposed by Governor Phips. Danforth was sympathetic to the plight of individuals accused, relocating some of them to his lands west of Boston; Salem End Road in Framingham is part of the area where they settled.

Family and property
Danforth married Mary Withington in 1644. The couple had 12 children, but half of these died before the age of three. Danforth was survived by only three of the others.  Danforth died in Cambridge on November 5, 1699. During his lifetime, Danforth owned an enslaved man named Philip Ffeild.

In 1662 Danforth began to acquire land to the west of Boston by way of land grants by the Great and General Court after general surveys conducted by Edmund Rice at the behest of the Court. Originally known as "Danforth's Farm", he began to refer to the estate as "Framingham" in the 1670s in honor of his birthplace. Although Danforth continued to reside in Cambridge, he developed these lands, which came to number , by issuing 999 year leases rather than selling parcels. By the 1690s a number of somewhat discontiguous communities existed on the land, which petitioned the state for incorporation.  Objections were made to the earliest petition (of 1692) by Danforth, since it did not include all of his lands, and a number of subsequent petitions were objected to by neighboring communities.  It was not until 1700, after Danforth had died, that the town of Framingham was granted a charter.  The town's seal contains the words "Danforth's Farms" in commemoration of this heritage.

Danforth, Maine is named in his honor.  The Danforth Museum of Art, founded in 1975, is located in Framingham.

Fictional character in The Crucible
In Arthur Miller's 1953 play The Crucible, Danforth is depicted as the leading judicial figure overseeing the Salem trials.  William Stoughton is not a character in the play, and Miller portrays Danforth as an honest but domineering and selfish judge, under whose authority many are imprisoned and sentenced to hang. When John Proctor, an accused, defies his authority at the end of the play by refusing to lie and sign a public confession saying that he is a wizard and accusing others, he is mercilessly sentenced to hang. In an introduction to the play, Miller wrote that he had combined several persons and made other changes to the historical characters for dramatic purposes.

Miller also wrote the screenplay for the 1996 film version of the play, in which the name Danforth was retained (portrayed by actor Paul Scofield) as the principal judicial antagonist. In the 1957 film adaptation of the play, whose screenplay was written by Jean-Paul Sartre, Danforth (portrayed by Raymond Rouleau, who also directed the picture) is portrayed the same way.

Citations

Bibliography

External links
Original Harvard Charter of 1650 listing Thomas Danforth as Treasurer 
Framingham, Massachusetts History website
Framlingham UK website with a large section on the Danforths and Framingham Massachusetts

1623 births
1699 deaths
American Puritans
American slave owners
Critics of witch hunting
Harvard University staff
Justices of the Massachusetts Superior Court of Judicature
Kingdom of England emigrants to Massachusetts Bay Colony
Lieutenant Governors of colonial Massachusetts
People from Framlingham
People of the Salem witch trials